Kamarajar Deseeya Congress (Kamraj National Congress), is a political party in the Indian state of Tamil Nadu. The party general secretary of the party is M.S. Rajendran. The flag of the party carried the portrait of former Tamil Nadu Chief Minister Kamraj.

The party is working extensively for official recognition of freedom fighters, such as Tirupur Kumaran.

References

Political parties in Tamil Nadu
Political parties with year of establishment missing